Blue Sky Blue is the sixth studio album by Australian rock musician Pete Murray. The album was released on 1 February 2013 peaked at number 17 on the ARIA Charts. The album is a reworking Murray's 2011 album Blue Sky Blue with Murray re-recording the album featuring fellow Australian musicians.

Track listing

Charts

References

2013 albums
Pete Murray (Australian singer-songwriter) albums